DMC Rehabilitation Institute of Michigan (RIM) is one of the eight hospitals affiliated with the Detroit Medical Center. RIM is one of the largest, academic, rehabilitation hospitals in the United States specializing in rehabilitation medicine and research. RIM offers clinical treatment in spinal cord injury, brain injury, stroke, complex trauma and orthopedics and catastrophic injury care. The institute is home to the Center for Spinal Cord Injury Recovery, a facility designed to implement and study innovative treatments in spinal cord injury recovery.

RIM also houses the Southeastern Michigan Traumatic Brain Injury System (SEMTBIS) which conducts groundbreaking research in the field of rehabilitation medicine, sharing the resulting innovations with brain injury providers worldwide. Clinical researchers study issues such as medication effects, course of recovery, psychological factors and treatment outcomes.

RIM also operates over 30 outpatient therapy clinics throughout southeast Michigan, specializing in physical therapy, sports medicine and orthopedics.

History 
In 1951, Rehabilitation Institute of Metropolitan Detroit was founded at the Herman Kiefer Hospital in Detroit. This was also the site of the Metropolitan Detroit Polio Foundation, which merged with the Rehabilitation Institute in 1953. These two partners soon realized they needed a building of their own to house all their services. As a result, in 1958, the Rehabilitation Institute moved to a newly built hospital at its current location at 261 Mack Avenue, in Detroit.

Services
During the last 10 years, RIM has been awarded $16 million in federal and private grants for rehabilitation research focusing on restoring function, improving quality of life and developing innovative therapeutic techniques.

Today, RIM is considered a national leader in the field of physical medicine and rehabilitation. With its 94-bed inpatient hospital and numerous outpatient sites located throughout southeastern Michigan, RIM is also one of the nation's largest freestanding rehabilitation hospitals.

Clinical Specialties 
Clinical Specialties at RIM include:
 Amputee Services
 Aquatic Therapy
 Assistive Technology
 Balance Disorders
 Brain Injury Services
 Cancer Rehabilitation
 Dysphagia
 Electromyography (EMG)
 Hand Therapy
 Lymphedema Therapy
 Multiple Sclerosis
 Muscle Energy Technique
 Myofascial Release
 Neuro Rehabilitation
 Occupational Therapy
 Orthotics
 Pediatric Rehabilitation
 Physical Therapy
 Recreational Therapy
 Rehabilitation Psychology & Neuropsychology
 Return-to-Work Services
 Spasticity Management
 Speech-Language Pathology
 Spinal Cord Injury Services
 Sports Medicine and Rehabilitation
 Stroke Services
 Temporomandibular joint dysfunction
 Vestibular Rehabilitation
 Wheelchair Services
 Women's Rehab

Brasza Outpatient and Fitness Center 
RIM's Brasza Outpatient Center is a state of the art, multi-level fitness center.  It houses modern fitness equipment, a free-weight area, running tracks and studios offering a variety of programs, from group exercise and wheelchair mobility training, to community education.  The center also includes a sports medicine program directed by therapists and athletic trainers.

Brasza Outpatient and Fitness Center Services Include:
 Sports Medicine
 Orthopedic Therapy
 Personal Training
 Post Rehab Training
 Sports Specific Training
 Massage
 Work Hardening
 Women's rehab
 Lymphedema Therapy
Cardiac Rehabilitation (Phase II / Phase III)

Center for Spinal Cord Injury Recovery 
The Center for Spinal Cord Injury Recovery (CSCIR) is a unique, state-of-art clinical facility, offering an intensive physical therapy program focused on maximizing recovery from spinal cord injury. The program incorporates therapeutic techniques based on the newest information available from emerging research around the globe.

Accreditation 
RIM is fully accredited by the Joint Commission on Accreditation of Healthcare Organizations and the Commission on Accreditation for Rehabilitation Facilities (CARF).

References

External links 

 Detroit Medical Center
 DMC Rehabilitation Institute of Michigan
 Center for Spinal Cord Injury Recovery

Hospital buildings completed in 1958
Hospitals in Detroit
Teaching hospitals in Michigan
Detroit Medical Center
Tenet Healthcare